Typhoon II (foaled April 17, 1894) was an American thoroughbred racehorse that was bred in Tennessee and was the winner of the 1897 Kentucky Derby.

Typhoon won the Derby at 11-5 odds against the favored Ornament on a very muddy track. After his Derby win Typhoon II was sold on August 1, 1897 for $12,000 to Bromley & Co., owned by Joseph E. Bromley & Arthur Featherstone. He followed his Derby win by winning the Club Members' Handicap in St. Louis, Missouri but lost many races after his three-year-old season. The stallion's career declined in his fourth season, when he lost a race at Sheepshead Bay Race Track against only one other competitor.

Typhoon II was gelded in 1899 and was thereafter stabled at the Kenmore Farm in Lexington, a farm owned by Bromley & Co., to live the remainder of his life as a pensioner. By 1903, Featherstone ordered his trainer, Julius Bauer, to dispose of Typhoon II, as the horse's paddock was needed for another purpose. Bauer gave the horse to a friend in Lexington, who put him to work as a cart horse hauling hay for livestock.

Pedigree

References

1894 racehorse births
Racehorses trained in the United States
Racehorses bred in Tennessee
Kentucky Derby winners
Thoroughbred family A18